Blackouts is a solo album by German musician Manuel Göttsching, released in 1977. It was originally released as an Ashra album, but the 2012 reissue of the album is credited solely to Göttsching, who wrote and performed it on electric guitar and keyboards.

Track listing

All songs composed by Manuel Göttsching.

Personnel
Manuel Göttsching – guitars, keyboards, sequencer

References

1977 albums
Instrumental albums
Ashra (band) albums